The R. J. Lalonde Arena is a 1,800-seat multi-purpose arena in Bonnyville, Alberta, and is among the facilities of the Bonnyville & District Centennial Centre.  It is home to the Bonnyville Pontiacs ice hockey team. The arena was opened on November 27, 1982.

External links 
Arena overview from the Bonnyville & District Centennial Centre

Indoor arenas in Alberta
Indoor ice hockey venues in Canada
1982 establishments in Alberta
Sports venues completed in 1982